Andrew Bell may refer to:

 Andrew Bell (artist) (born 1978), British-born American toy designer
 Andrew Bell (engraver) (1726–1809), Scottish co-founder of the Encyclopædia Britannica
 Andrew Bell (educationalist) (1753–1832), Scottish pioneer of mutual instruction and author of the Madras System of Education
 Andrew Bell (cricketer) (born 1982), English former cricketer
 Andrew Bell (journalist) ( 1827–1863),  Scottish-born Canadian journalist
 Andrew Bell (minister) (1803–1856), Presbyterian minister in Upper Canada
 Andrew Bell (moderator), minister of the Church of Scotland
 Andrew Bell (judge) (born 1966), Australian judge
 Andrew J. Bell Jr. (1907–2000), African American business owner and civil rights activist

See also
Andy Bell (disambiguation)